Protein ETHE1, mitochondrial, also known as "ethylmalonic encephalopathy 1 protein" and "per sulfide dioxygenase", is a protein that in humans is encoded by the ETHE1 gene located on chromosome 19.

Structure 

The human ETHE1 gene consists of 7 exons and encodes for a protein that is approximately 27 kDa in size.

Function 

This gene encodes a protein that is expressed mainly in the gastrointestinal tract, but also in several other tissues such as the liver and the thyroid.

The ETHE1 protein is thought to localize primarily to the mitochondrial matrix and functions as a sulfur dioxygenase.  Sulfur deoxygenates are proteins that function in sulfur metabolism. The ETHE1 protein is thought to catalyze the following reaction:

 sulfur + O2 + H2O  sulfite + 2 H+ (overall reaction)
 (1a) glutathione + sulfur  S-sulfanylglutathione (glutathione persulfide, spontaneous reaction)
 (1b) S-sulfanylglutathione + O2 + H2O  glutathione + sulfite + 2 H+

and requires iron and possibly glutathione as cofactors. The physiological substrate of ETHE1 is thought to be glutathione persulfide, an intermediate metabolite involved in hydrogen sulfide degradation.

Clinical significance 

Mutations in ETHE1 gene  are thought to cause ethylmalonic encephalopathy, a rare inborn error of metabolism. Patients carrying ETHE1 mutations have been found to exhibit lower activity of ETHE1 and affinity for the ETHE1 substrate. Mouse models of Ethe1 genetic ablation likewise exhibited reduced sulfide dioxygenase catabolism and cranial features of ethylmalonic encephalopathy. Decrease in sulfide dioxygenase activity results in abnormal catabolism of hydrogen sulfide, a gas-phase signaling molecule in the central nervous system, whose accumulation is thought to inhibit cytochrome c oxidase activity in the respiratory chain of the mitochondrion. However, other metabolic pathways may also be involved that could exert a modulatory effect on hydrogen sulfide toxicity.

Interactions 

ETHE1 has been shown to interact with RELA.

References

Further reading 

 
 
 
 
 
 
 
 
 

Genes
Human proteins